Fildžan viška is the fifth studio album by Bosnian rock band Zabranjeno Pušenje, released in 1997. It was released through Dallas Records in Croatia and Slovenia, and Nimfa Sound in Bosnia and Herzegovina.

It's the first album where Sejo Sexon took over the role of the lead singer in the band.

Promotion 
Immediately following the release of Fildžan viška, the band embarked on a tour to support the record. The band realized 149 concerts for promotion of the album.

Track listing
Source: Discogs

Personnel 
Credits adapted from the album's liner notes.

Zabranjeno Pušenje
 Sejo Sexon – lead vocals, guitar, backing vocals
 Samir Ćeremida – bass
 Đani Pervan – drums, backing vocals
 Elvis J. Kurtovich – vocals, backing vocals
 Marin Gradac Mako – trombone, vocals, backing vocals 
 Sejo Kovo – lead guitar, rhythm guitar
 Dušan Vranić Duco – keyboards, backing vocals

Production
 Sejo Sexon – co–production, audio mixing
 Zlaja Hadžić Jeff – co–production, recording, mastering, audio mixing (Rent-A-Cow Studio in Amsterdam, the Netherlands)
 Denis Mujadžić Denyken – production, audio mixing
 Maarten de Boer – sound engineering, mastering (The Masters in Bontebok, The Netherlands)
 Aco Razbornik – audio mixing (Studio Tivoli in Ljubljana, Slovenia)
 Predrag Bobić Bleka – executive production
 Elvis J. Kurtovich – executive production

Design
Albino Uršić Bino – design
Boris Kuk Boro – design
Mio Vesović – photos
Darije Petković – photos
Boris Berc – photos

References

1997 albums
Zabranjeno Pušenje albums